The Valea Cerbului is a right tributary of the river Prahova in Romania. It source is in the Bucegi Mountains. It flows into the Prahova in Bușteni.

Tributaries

The following rivers are tributaries to the river Valea Cerbului (from source to mouth):

Left: Pârâul Dracilor, Râpa Roșie, Fântânița, Valea Comorilor, Valea Morarului, Valea Seacă a Baiului, Pârâul Lung, Valea Baiului, Pârâul Scurt
Right: Valea Căldărilor, Valea Priponului, Valea Caprelor, Valea Urzicii, Valea Țapului, Valea Seacă, Valea Scorușilor, Valea Coștilei, Valea Gâlmei

References

Rivers of Romania
Rivers of Prahova County